Ayşe Hatun Önal (born 29 July 1978) is a Turkish model, actress, singer and Miss Turkey 1999 who represented her country in the 49th Miss World 1999 in London, England.

Career
She graduated from Adana Borsa High School in Adana. Ayşe was a professional model while she was a university student. She studied Public relations at Anadolu University in Eskişehir but left after second grade.

She participated in the Miss Turkey contest in 1999, and won the title. That same year in December, she represented her country at the Miss World 1999.

Since 2004, she successfully played in a number of films, mini television series and commercials. She is interested in music and listens mostly to Sezen Aksu, Sertab Erener, U2, Madonna, Depeche Mode, and Prince.

Önal's voice is alto.

Discography

Studio albums

EPs

Singles

As featured artist

Filmography
Bu Film Bitmez (2001)
Derman Bey (2001) (TV series)
Mumya Firarda (2002)

Awards and nominations

References

External links

1978 births
Living people
People from Adana
Turkish female models
Turkish dance musicians
Miss Turkey winners
Miss World 1999 delegates
Turkish pop singers
Turkish singer-songwriters
Turkish television actresses
21st-century Turkish singers
21st-century Turkish women singers